Gravel Hill, Virginia may refer to:
Gravel Hill, Henrico County, Virginia, an unincorporated community
Gravel Hill, Buckingham County, Virginia, an unincorporated community